Alan Jones is a film critic, broadcaster and reporter on the Horror Fantasy genre who has travelled the world to report on movies in production. His first assignment was the original Star Wars in 1977, after which he became London correspondent for Cinefantastique magazine (1977–2002) and reviewed for British magazine Starburst from 1980 until 2008. A film critic for Film Review and Radio Times, he has made contributions to the Radio Times Guide to Films, the Radio Times Guide to Science Fiction and Halliwell's Film Guide.  He has also served as film critic for BBC News 24, Front Row on BBC Radio 4, and on Sky News programme Sunrise.  He has worked for many of the long-established cinema magazines – Empire, Premiere and Total Film, an article in which – The Splat Pack – is credited for the first use of a term that is now part of film industry jargon.

Punk connections 
Jones' punk-era reminiscences about close friend Sid Vicious formed the basis of director Alex Cox's screenplay Sid and Nancy. He has spoken about the friendship in several TV and radio documentaries. Jones worked for designer Vivienne Westwood in her shop SEX, and was the DJ for the Sex Pistols, for whom he starred as a music executive in the film The Great Rock 'n' Roll Swindle.

TV work 
Jones' TV work has included Film Four documentaries about Italian horror directors Mario Bava and Dario Argento and Channel Four's The Top 100 British Box Office Hits.  On the BBC, he was involved in the I Love the '70s BBC documentary series, talking about disco music and his arrest for wearing punk tee shirts.  In addition to these contributions to British TV, he has made television appearances in countries as diverse as Argentina, Colombia, Italy, Spain, Finland and Russia.

Festivals and film juries 
As a co-presenter of London's Shock Around The Clock festival, and the NFT's 'Fantasm', he conducted The Guardian lectures with directors Freddie Francis and Dario Argento and hosted Q&A sessions with, amongst others, director Danny Boyle and the cast of Slumdog Millionaire. He presented 'Brit-Invaders' at the Science + Fiction Festival in Trieste and filmed interviews with Neil Marshall (The Descent, Doomsday) and Ray Harryhausen (Jason and the Argonauts, One Million Years BC). Jones is an active member of the London Critic's Circle, whose annual film awards are recognised worldwide.  He has also served on festival juries at Sitges (Spain), Fantasporto (Portugal), Paris, Rome, Science+Fiction (Trieste), Motel X (Lisbon), Lund (Sweden), Strasbourg and Avoriaz (France).

FrightFest 
After stints co-presenting the legendary Shock Around The Clock festival in London, and Fantasm at the National Film Theatre, Jones is now a leading figure and co-curator of London FrightFest Film Festival. In 2022 Jones became the Artistic Director of the Trieste Science+Fiction Festival, the world's oldest sci-fi event, in Italy.

Film appearances 
Jones has acted in several movies, including Terror, The Great Rock 'n' Roll Swindle and The Errand. He features prominently in the documentary Video Nasties: Moral Panic, Censorship and Videotape and its sequel by director Jake West and has appeared in numerous rock videos, including those for 10cc, Duran Duran and Robbie Williams.

DVD commentaries 
Jones' DVD commentaries include those for Alejandro Jodorowsky's Santa Sangre, Nicolas Winding Refn's Valhalla Rising, Bronson and Fear X, Tom Shankland's WAZ, Andrew Birkin's Cement Garden, Tony Maylam's The Burning, Paul China's Crawl, Lucio Fulci's Zombie Flesh Eaters and Dario Argento's The Bird with the Crystal Plumage, The Card Player, The Stendhal Syndrome, Tenebrae and Suspiria. His moderated commentary with Oscar-winning actress Helen Mirren for Tinto Brass' Caligula is considered a milestone in the art form. He has also contributed to the DVD extras for the Arrow Mario Bava Collection and the Blu-ray releases of Heavenly Creatures, Demons and the A Nightmare on Elm Street collection.

Current projects 
Jones worked with director Nicolas Winding Refn on the book 'The Act of Seeing', a volume of vintage posters charting the history of 42nd Street exploitation.

Bibliography

Books (as author) 
Profondo Argento, Jones, Alan, FAB Press, London 2004 
Dario Argento: the Man, the Myths, the Magic, Jones, Alan, FAB Press, London 2012 (revised version of Profondo Argento)
Saturday Night Forever: The Story of Disco, Jones, Alan and Kantonen, Jussi, Mainstream, Edinburgh 2005
The Rough Guide to Horror Movies,, Jones, Alan, Rough Guides, London 2005 
Tomb Raider: The Official Companion, Jones, Alan, Carlton, London, 2001
The FrightFest Fearbook. Jones, Alan, Revolver Books, London 2006
The FrightFest Guide to Exploitation Movies FAB Press 2016
The FrightFest Guide to Grindhouse Movies FAB Presentation 2021
Alan Jones: The Complete Starburst Reviews 1978-2008 FAB Press 2023
Discomania FAB Press 2024

Books (as contributor) 
The BFI Companion to Horror (contributor)
Shock Xpress Volume 1 & 2 (contributor)
Brian De Palma Interviews (contributor)
Femmes Fatales (contributor)
Zombie (contributor)
Eyeball (contributor)
 Shadows in Eden (contributor)

Books (mentioned in) 
Vivienne Westwood: A Biography  Mulvagh, Jane, Harper Collins, London, 1998
England's Dreaming Savage, Jon, Faber, London, 1991
I Was A Teenage Sex Pistol Matlock, Glen, Omnibus, London, 1990k
Sid Vicious Parker, Alan, Orion, London, 2007
Not Abba: The Real Story of the 1970s Haslam, David, Fourth Estate, London, 2005
Vacant Stevenson, Nils, Thames & Hudson, London, 1999
Defying Gravity: Jordan's Story Omnibus Press 2019

TV and radio contributions 
 Final 24 (the Last 24 Hours of...Sid Vicious) (Canadian TV documentary)
 My Way: The Sid Vicious Story (Radio 6)
 Who Killed Nancy? (film)
 Van Damme – The Muscles From Brussels Channel 5)
  Hitchcock (Sci-Fi Channel)
 The Day Britain Turned Disco 
When Disco Ruled the World
 Punk Britannia BBC 4, June 2012

References

External links 
 FrightFest website
 Rotten Tomatoes website (contributions to)

British film critics
Sex Pistols
Living people
Year of birth missing (living people)